Bizonnes is a commune in the Isère department in southeastern France. The closest airport to Bizonnes is Grenoble Airport (10 km).

Geography
Bizonnes is located 20 miles from Bourgoin-Jallieu and 18 km from Voiron.

Population

See also
Communes of the Isère department

References
INSEE commune file

Communes of Isère

Isère communes articles needing translation from French Wikipedia